Kwong Chi-kin (born 15 February 1958 in Hong Kong) was the member of the Legislative Council of Hong Kong (Legco), representing labour industry. He graduated as a Bachelor of Social Sciences from the Chinese University of Hong Kong. He graduated as a Bachelor of Laws and Master of Laws from the University of London.  
He is now the legal adviser of the Hong Kong Federation of Trade Unions.

External links
Legislative Councillor of Hong Kong Federation of Trade Union

References

1958 births
Living people
Hong Kong Federation of Trade Unions
Solicitors of Hong Kong
Alumni of the Chinese University of Hong Kong
Alumni of the University of London
HK LegCo Members 2004–2008